New York's 35th State Senate district is one of 63 districts in the New York State Senate. It has  been represented by Democrat Andrea Stewart-Cousins, the current Senate Majority Leader, since 2007.

Geography
District 35 covers a portion of southern Westchester County, including all of Greenburgh and Scarsdale and parts of Yonkers, White Plains, and New Rochelle.

The district overlaps with New York's 16th and 17th congressional districts, and with the 88th, 89th, 90th, 91st, 92nd, and 93rd districts of the New York State Assembly.

Recent election results

2020

2018

2016

2014

2012

Federal results in District 35

References

35